St Cecilia's Catholic Primary School, a school established in 1930 in Balgowlah, New South Wales, Australia near Sydney in the Roman Catholic Diocese of Broken Bay
 St Cecilia's Catholic Primary School, a school established in 1916 in Wyong, New South Wales, Australia in the Roman Catholic Diocese of Broken Bay
 St Cecilia School of Music, a private music school in Tasmania, Australia
 St Cecilia's Primary School, a Catholic school established in 1932 in Glen Iris, Victoria, Australia
 St. Cecilia Catholic School, an elementary school in the High Park North neighborhood of Toronto, Ontario, Canada
 St Cecilia Catholic Elementary school is an elementary is school in Maple, Ontario, Canada
 St Cecilia's Roman Catholic High School, a secondary school in Longridge, Lancashire, England
 Saint Cecilia's Church of England School, a secondary school in Wandsworth, London, England
 Accademia Nazionale di Santa Cecilia, or St. Ceclia Academy, a music school in Rome, Italy
 St Cecilia's Convent Secondary School, also known as SM Konven St. Cecilia, a school near Sandakan, Sabah, Malaysia

 In the United States
 St. Cecilia School, the parish grade school of St. Cecilia Catholic Church (Los Angeles) in California
 St. Cecilia School, a grade school in San Francisco, California
 St. Cecilia School, a grade school in Tustin, Orange County, California
 St. Cecilia Elementary School, a grade school in Stamford, Connecticut
 St. Cecilia Elementary School, a grade school in Ames, Iowa
 St. Cecilia School, a defunct grade school in Peoria, Illinois in which hostages were taken in 1973
 St. Cecilia Catholic School, a grade school in Haysville, Kansas
 St. Cecilia Elementary School, a grade school in Independence, Kenton County, Kentucky
 St. Cecilia School, a defunct grade school that became Community Catholic School in 1978 and closed in 2004 in Louisville, Jefferson County, Kentucky
St. Cecilia School (Broussard, Louisiana), a grade school listed on the National Register of Historic Places in Lafayette Parish
 St. Cecilia Catholic School, a grade school in Clare, Clare County, Michigan
 St. Cecilia School, a grade school in Detroit, Wayne County, Michigan
 St. Cecilia School, a grade school in Saint Louis, Missouri
 St. Cecilia High School (Nebraska), part of St. Cecilia Middle and High School in Hastings, Adams County, Nebraska
 St. Cecilia Cathedral School, a grade school in Omaha, Douglas County, Nebraska
 St. Cecilia High School (New Jersey), a defunct high school in Englewood, Bergen County, New Jersey that closed in 1986 and was the first coaching job for Vince Lombardi
 St. Cecilia Interparochial School, a defunct grade school on West Demarest Avenue in Englewood, Bergen County, New Jersey that closed in 2011
 St. Cecilia Elementary School, a grade school in Pennsauken, Camden County, New Jersey
 St. Cecilia Elementary School, a grade school in Rockaway, Morris County, New Jersey
 St. Cecilia's School, a former parochial school of Saint Cecilia's Catholic Church (Brooklyn, New York)
 St. Cecilia Elementary School, a grade school in Cincinnati, Hamilton County, Ohio
 St. Cecilia Elementary School, a grade school in Columbus, Franklin County, Ohio
 St. Cecilia School, a grade school in Beaverton, Oregon
 St. Cecilia Elementary School, a grade school in Philadelphia, Pennsylvania
 St. Cecilia School, a grade school in Pawtucket, Rhode Island
 St. Cecilia Academy, a high school in Nashville, Tennessee
 St. Cecilia Catholic School, a grade school in Dallas, Dallas County, Texas
 St. Cecilia Catholic School (Houston, Texas), a grade school in Hedwig Village, Harris County, Texas in the Roman Catholic Archdiocese of Galveston-Houston
 St. Cecilia School, a grade school in San Antonio, Bexar County, Texas
 St. Cecilia Catholic School, a grade school in Bainbridge Island, Washington